Game On: A Comedy Crossover Event is an American streaming television series which unites the casts of four of its family sitcoms for a comedy event which are The Big Show Show, Mr. Iglesias, The Expanding Universe of Ashley Garcia, and Family Reunion.

Cast 
 Paul Wight as himself
 Allison Munn as Cassy Wight
 Reylynn Caster as Lola Wight
 Lily Brooks O'Briant as Mandy Wight
 Juliet Donenfeld as J.J. Wight
 Gabriel "Fluffy" Iglesias as Gabe Iglesias
 Sherri Shepherd as Paula Madison
 Jacob Vargas as Tony Ochoa
 Maggie Geha as Abby Spencer
 Cree Cicchino as Marisol Fuentes
 Fabrizio Guido as Mikey Gutierrez
 Tucker Albrizzi as Walt
 Paulina Chávez as Ashley Garcia
 Conor Husting as Tad Cameron
 Bella Podaras as Brooke Bishop
 Reed Horstmann as Stick Goldstein
 Jencarlos Canela as Victor Garcia
Tia Mowry as Cocoa McKellan
Anthony Alabi as Moz McKellan
Talia Jackson as Jade McKellan
Isaiah Russell-Bailey as Shaka McKellan
Cameron J. Wright as Mazzi McKellan
Jordyn Raya James as Ami McKellan
Loretta Devine as M'Dear
Luenell as Peaches

Episodes

Release
Game On: A Comedy Crossover Event was released on August 10, 2020 on Netflix.

References

External links
 
 

2020 American television series debuts
2020s American sitcoms
English-language Netflix original programming
Television series about families
Television shows set in Georgia (U.S. state)
Television shows set in Pasadena, California
Television shows set in Tampa, Florida